Áedammair, Gaelic-Irish female given name.

Áedammair was a name used beginning in Medieval Ireland. It has enjoyed a slight resurgence in the late 20th and early 21st century.

External links
 http://medievalscotland.org/kmo/AnnalsIndex/Feminine/Aedammair.shtml
 http://www.lorrainequirke.com/irishnames/namesA.html

Irish-language feminine given names